is the second of two double live albums released by Japanese novelty heavy metal band Animetal. Released by Sony Records on October 1, 1999, it was recorded at the band's concert at the Shibuya Club Quattro on July 31, 1999. This was the band's last release before undergoing a two-year hiatus.

Track listing
All tracks are arranged by Animetal.

Personnel
 - Lead vocals
 - Guitar
Masaki - Bass

with

Katsuji - Drums

References

External links

1999 albums
Animetal albums
Live albums by Japanese artists
Japanese-language live albums
Sony Music Entertainment Japan albums